Atu (also Romanized as Atū and Otū) is a village in Kaseliyan Rural District, in the Central District of Savadkuh County, Mazandaran Province, Iran. At the 2006 census, its population was 565, in 133 families.

References 

Populated places in Savadkuh County